Spiralizoros silvestrii is a species of angel insect in the family Zorotypidae. It is found in Southern Asia.

This species was formerly a member of the genus Zorotypus.

References

Further reading

 
 

Zoraptera
Articles created by Qbugbot
Insects described in 1927